Metopium toxiferum, the poisonwood, Florida poisontree, or hog gum, is a species of flowering tree in the cashew or sumac family, Anacardiaceae, that is native to the American Neotropics. It produces the irritant urushiol much like its close relatives poison sumac and poison oak. It is related to black poisonwood (Metopium brownei).

Distribution and habitat
This tree grows abundantly in the Florida Keys and can also be found in various ecosystems in southern Florida. Its range extends from Florida and The Bahamas south through the Caribbean.

References

External links
Poisonwood (Metopium toxiferum)

Anacardiaceae
Trees of the Southeastern United States
Trees of the Caribbean
Plants described in 1896
Poisonous plants